Paramount Ballroom may refer to: 

 The Paramount Ballroom, Alec Lazo's ballroom in West Palm Beach, Florida, U.S.
 Paramount (Shanghai)

Lists of entertainment venues